Joseph T. Johnson (born July 11, 1972) is a former American football defensive end in the National Football League (NFL) for the New Orleans Saints and the Green Bay Packers. In the 1994 NFL draft, he was selected by the Saints in the first round (13th overall). He was elected to the Pro Bowl after the 1998 season, missed the entire 1999 season with a severe knee injury that left his career in doubt, but came back in 2000 to once again be named to the Pro Bowl and also named the NFL Comeback Player of the Year. In 2002 Green Bay picked him up in free agency and ESPN named him the biggest free agency bust in Green Bay's history. The Packers gave the former Saints defender a six-year, $33 million contract that included a $6.5 million signing bonus. What they got in return was two sacks in 11 games over two injury-filled seasons, before they cut him. He was a standout at the University of Louisville.

References

External links
http://www.pro-football-reference.com/players/J/JohnJo04.htm

1972 births
Living people
Players of American football from Cleveland
American football defensive ends
American football defensive tackles
Louisville Cardinals football players
New Orleans Saints players
Green Bay Packers players
National Conference Pro Bowl players
Players of American football from Missouri
Ed Block Courage Award recipients